Jay Glover (born 1 May 2003) is an English professional footballer who plays as a midfielder for Gainsborough Trinity on loan from Sheffield Wednesday.

Career

Sheffield Wednesday
Glover joined Wednesday aged 14 on 8 May 2017 after playing with local sides Sheffield Boys, Greenhill and Young Owls. After completing his two-year scholarship, Glover signed his maiden professional deal in June 2021. Jay Glover makes his professional debut against Rochdale in the EFL Cup on 23 August 2022.

On 2 December 2022, he joined Belper Town on a one-month loan alongside team mate Paulo Aguas. Following the expiration of his one-month loan with Belper Town, he would join Gainsborough Trinity on a three-month loan.

Career statistics

References

2003 births
Living people
English footballers
Sheffield Wednesday F.C. players
Belper Town F.C. players
Gainsborough Trinity F.C. players